Leighton Park School is a co-educational private school for both day and boarding pupils in Reading in South East England. The school's ethos is closely tied to the Quaker values, having been founded as a Quaker School in 1890. The school's ethos is described as achievement with values, character and community. It is one of seven Quaker schools in England.

Overview 
The school is based in a 65-acre parkland estate just south of Reading town centre, next to the University of Reading's Whiteknights Park campus. The school has been a member of the Headmasters' and Headmistresses' Conference since 1932. It offers both the International Baccalaureate and A Levels at Sixth Form.

Matthew Judd has been the headmaster since September 2018.

At A level in 2019, pupils' progress score was Well Above Average with students gaining 0.6 of a grade on average across their subjects. No data were published by the Department for Education for the school at GCSE level.

The School was inspected by the Independent Schools Inspectorate in November 2021 and was found to be excellent for both the quality of pupils’ personal development and the quality of their academic progress.

There are 27 music teachers covering a range of instruments. The school offers dance with a new studio built in 2020 and a GCSE and A Levels qualifications available. The school's music and media centre opened in 2019. It offers a BTec in Digital Media Production at both level 2 and level 3 and works with nearby Pinewood Studios.

Old School and attached laboratories at Leighton Park are Grade II listed buildings. Grove House was designed by Victorian architect Alfred Waterhouse, who also designed the Natural History Museum in London.

History
Leighton Park was opened in 1890 by members of the Religious Society of Friends (Quakers), as a public school for boys. It was founded after Grove House School, also a Quaker school, closed in 1877. Grove House School had educated notable personalities such as Lord Lister, Alfred Waterhouse and Thomas Hodgkin.

Leighton Park grew from four boys in 1890 to 103 in the 1920s. The junior school became the independent Crosfields School, making Leighton Park solely a senior school. By 1970 the school had 300 pupils, and in 1975 girls were admitted to the sixth form. In 1993 the school became fully coeducational. Today the school is home to around 520 pupils drawn from over 44 different countries.

In 2015, the school celebrated its 125-year anniversary.

In March 2016, the school was granted planning permission to develop the main hall and music department into the Music and Media Centre (MMC) which will enhance the facilities for teaching Music and Media at the school. The building officially opened in March 2019. The school is currently redeveloping the historic Grove House to be a new Sixth Form Study Centre and School Library - due to open in early 2024.

Quaker ethos
Reflecting its Quaker values, the school has an active outreach programme, supporting local community and education partners. The School won the national Independent School Association Award for Outstanding Community Involvement in 2020 and 2021. The school's values-led approach helped it to win the national ISA Award for Excellence in Pupil Personal Development 2022.

Leighton Park, due to its Quaker heritage, has customs and traditions which differ from those in Anglican schools. These include:

"Collect": A daily meeting similar to other schools' assemblies, in which pupils gather for presentations and talks. Every collect ends with a silence lasting several minutes to reflect on the topic addressed. Unlike many school assemblies, hymns are not sung. These generally occur on Mondays, Fridays and alternating Wednesdays.
"Meeting for Worship": A weekly event similar to Quaker meetings across the country. The meeting lasts about 20–25 minutes and is held in silence to reflect on thoughts and feelings, with a free forum for anyone to stand up and speak about issues on their mind. This occurs on Thursday mornings at 10:30.
"Monthly Meeting": A meeting in which pupils can air grievances on any matter. It is usually chaired by the head boy and head girl. The school senior management are usually present to respond. These occur monthly on Tuesday mornings.
In the spirit of Quaker teachings, pupils and staff refer to each other on a first name basis in order to create a sense of equality.

Houses
There are three boarding houses at Leighton Park: two senior (School for boys and Reckitt for girls) and one junior (Fryer) boarding house for 11 and 12 year old students. Each senior house has around 65 boarders, and the junior house has 24 pupils.

The school also has four competition houses, which are integral to school life with many inter-house competitions, charity and community events occurring throughout the year, including the annual house music competition, the Richard Coleman sports shield and the merit cup. The competition houses are called Cadbury, Fox, Bentsi-Enchill and Tubman.

The first house established was the original "School House" which is now called "Old School" due to the construction of a more modern house which retains the same name, followed by 'Grove House', after Grove School, which Leighton Park has historical links with. The junior house, 'Fryer', houses pupils aged 11–13 and was refurbished in 2021 to provide specialist boarding accommodation for these younger students. Reckitt and School are the senior boarding houses, with approximately 65 girls and boys respectively. As of 2020 Grove house was formally closed and is being turned into a Sixth Form Study Centre and School Library.

Sport

The school has a floodlit astroturf sports pitch and 22 tennis courts along with four main sports fields. The school's provision includes athletics, cricket, rugby, hockey and netball, football, tennis and swimming. The school awards sports scholarships to talented students.

The school hosts an annual cross-country competition with a course more than 2.5 km long. There is also a house 'Road Relay' race and regular inter-house sport competitions in rugby, football, athletics, hockey, tennis and swimming.

Music and drama

Music
All students at the school have the chance to learn an instrument; 27 music teachers are available. The school awards music scholarships and organises multiple concerts, an annual house music competition and has multiple musical groups such as the orchestra, vocal, jazz and brass groups.

The school has a Music and Media Centre (MMC). The building includes a new frontage and extension on the side which enhances the facilities for teaching Music and Media and also provide a new pedestrianised landscape area around the hall. The building contains seven new practice rooms and three specialist music classrooms; a 'live lounge' inspired by BBC Radio 1, which can be used for band rehearsals, recordings and broadcasts; a custom-built media room including a green screen, lighting, editing equipment and a surround sound cinema system.

Drama
Leighton Park's Main Hall theatre is the home of school productions. It is also often hired by local choral and drama companies. There is usually one main School production per academic year, alternating between a musical and a play.

Younger students at Leighton Park have the opportunity to perform in the "Fryer Festival" in the summer.

The school offers GCSE drama as well as A-level theatre studies.

Press
Leighton Park appeared on the BBC One Show in 2020, featuring the school's production of PPE for health workers during the Covid-19 pandemic 
Leighton Park was featured on the BBC Politics Show, which was hosted at the site in December 2010.

In April 2005, Quaker-based Sunday Worship was broadcast live from Leighton Park on BBC Radio 4. Heard by an estimated 1.75 million listeners, the sequence of readings, music, ministry and silence "reflected the essence of Quaker values to the wider world."

In November 2011 thieves stole Maverick the Harris hawk from a teacher's aviary. Maverick was used "to build a more adventurous curriculum for pupils" and helped students learn physics. Pupils were left distraught after the theft as a core team of pupils had been trained to handle him.

In popular culture
The school is mentioned in the play and film The History Boys by Alan Bennett. The headmaster mentions schools he would like to emulate regarding high pupil entry to Oxford; among them is Leighton Park — 'or is that an open prison?' he asks.

Former pupils

Notable old pupils include:

Sir John Adye, former director of the GCHQ
Crispin Aubrey, Civil Rights campaigner
Sir Tony Baldry, former MP
Julian Bell, poet and Bloomsbury member
Quentin Bell, Bloomsbury member, artist and writer
Eliza Bennett, actress
Sir Richard Rodney Bennett, composer and jazz pianist
Michael Binyon, journalist
Sir John Birch, former ambassador
Derek Brewer, Secretary and Chief Executive of Marylebone Cricket Club
Jim Broadbent, Oscar winning actor
Basil Bunting, poet
Egbert Cadbury, businessman in chocolate firms Fry's and Cadbury's and decorated First World War pilot
Kristian Callaghan, British pistol shooter, winner of Bronze Medal 2014 Commonwealth Games
Professor Edward Chaney, cultural historian
Lance Clark (retail; founder of Soul of Africa), ex-CEO of Clark's Shoes
Nathan Crowley, Oscar-nominated art director in the film industry
Baron Davies of Stamford, former MP, minister and life peer
Leonard Doncaster, geneticist
Christopher Dorling, co-founder of Dorling Kindersley 
Phil Dunster, actor, Olivier Award nominee 2016
Jason Durr, actor "Casualty"
Owen Edwards, pioneer of Welsh TV broadcasting
Hugh Foot, Baron Caradon, former ambassador
Michael Foot, former Labour Party leader
Robert Gillmor, artist and ornithologist
Hugh Haughton, Professor at York University
Tim Ingold, anthropologist and Professor at Aberdeen University
Sir David Lean, Oscar award-winning film director 
Po Shun Leong, artist
Peter Litten, film director
Tom Lowenstein, poet
David McFarland, former Professor of Animal Behaviour, Oxford University
Laura Marling, award-winning singer songwriter
Tom Maschler, publisher and writer; former Chairman of Cape, co-founder of The Booker Prize; founder of The Book Bus
 Peter May, cricketer, Captain of England, and later Chairman of the England cricket selectors
Jagat Singh Mehta, Foreign Secretary India, 1970s
John Mitchell, musician and music producer
Nicholas Moore, poet and son of GE Moore, Cambridge Philosopher 
Sir Oscar Morland, diplomat and ambassador
Prof. Peter Nienow, Edinburgh University, awarded Polar Medal 2017, recognition for his pioneering glaciological work in the Arctic.
Nathaniel Parker, award-winning actor
Patrick Parrinder, Professor of English, Reading University
Lionel Penrose, psychiatrist, medical geneticist, paediatrician, mathematician and chess theorist, Galton professor of eugenics at University College London
Sir Roland Penrose, artist, historian and poet
Henry Priestman, singer/songwriter (The Christians)
John Prizeman, Architect and leading Author on Modern design 
Prof. Dan Reinstein, eye surgeon
Karel Reisz, award-winning film director
Prof. Julian Stallabrass, art historian, photographer and lecturer, Courtauld
Ian Stillman, missionary
Richard Vernon, actor
Richard G. Wilkinson, social epidemiologist, author and advocate
Timothy Williamson, Wykeham Professor of Logic, Oxford University
Stuart Zender, musician
Shyam Bhatia, writer, journalist

Arms

See also
 List of Friends Schools
 Headmasters' and Headmistresses' Conference
 Old Leightonians Cricket Club

References

Further reading
 The Leightonian [school magazine] (pub. 1895).
 The Park [school magazine] (pub. termly).
 Old Leightonians Club. A list of names and addresses of the old boys of Leighton Park School (pub. 1945, 1957, 1973, 1990).
 Brown, S. W. Leighton Park: A history of the school (pub. 1952).
 Leighton Park School, Leighton Park: The first 100 years (pub. 1990).

External links

School website
Old Leightonians Cricket Club website
ISBI entry
 Welcome To GBS Swim School

1890 establishments in England
Boarding schools in Berkshire
Grade II listed buildings in Reading
Educational institutions established in 1890
Private schools in Reading, Berkshire
International Baccalaureate schools in England
Member schools of the Headmasters' and Headmistresses' Conference

Quaker schools in England